Garnedd Ugain, often referred to as "Crib-y-Ddysgl", is a pyramidal mountain in Wales that forms part of the Snowdon Massif. It is the second-highest peak in Wales, and lies just under one kilometre north of the summit of Snowdon itself.

It is part of the Snowdon Horseshoe route, being linked to Crib Goch via the col at Bwlch Coch, and to Snowdon summit via the col at Bwlch Glas.

Name

Both Garnedd Ugain and Crib-y-Ddysgl appear on the Ordnance Survey's maps of the area. The name Crib-y-Ddysgl refers to the east ridge  whilst the summit is Garnedd or Carnedd Ugain.

Crib-y-Ddysgl (meaning "ridge of the dish" in Welsh) is the name used by Alan Dawson for the peak's listing as a Hewitt.

Carnedd Ugain in Welsh means "Cairn of the Twenty" (the form Garnedd is the result of soft mutation).  This was possibly named after the Roman legion based in Caernarfon.

The web pages of the Welsh Mountaineering Club suggest that the name could also be a corruption of "Carnedd Wgon", and so named after the prince Wgon sung of by Dafydd ap Gwilym or possibly after the 13th-century poet Gwgon Brydydd.

References

Hewitts of Wales
Tourism in Gwynedd
Mountains and hills of Snowdonia
Nuttalls
Furths
Mountains and hills of Gwynedd
Beddgelert
Betws Garmon
Llanberis
One-thousanders of Wales